Synodontis orientalis is a species of upside-down catfish endemic to Tanzania, where it occurs in the Ruvu and probably also the Rufiji river basins. This species grows to a length of  SL.

References

External links 

orientalis
Catfish of Africa
Fish of Tanzania
Endemic fauna of Tanzania
Fish described in 2008